Euan Thorburn (born 19 October 1986) is a British rally driver from Duns. He was Scottish Rally Champion in 2014, 2017 and 2019 and was the BTRDA (British Trial & Rally Drivers Association) Champion for 2013 and 2019.

Career
His first rally was in 2005 at the wheel of a Peugeot 205 on a round of the Scottish Rally Championship. In 2006, he progressed to a Subaru Impreza but it was not until 2010 when he moved to a Mitsubishi EVO and a regular co-driver, Paul Beaton, that he started to achieve successful results culminating in the SRC runner-up position in 2011.

For season 2012 the duo made their debut in an ex-Carlos Sainz Ford Focus WRC.

In 2013 Thorburn attempted a full season in both the SRC and the BTRDA championship. A season of mixed fortunes saw him finish 5th overall in the SRC and championship winner of the BTRDA season.

SRC season 2014 saw Thorburn crowned champion after winning four of the eight events.

2016 saw Thorburn and Beaton mount an attack on the British Rally Championship in a Peugeot 208 T16. In a disappointing season they entered three rallies, only managing to finish one. In 2017 the pair entered selected BRC and SRC events in a Ford Fiesta R5. They finished 16th overall in the BRC and took the SRC title for the second time in their careers.

Complete World Rally Championship results

IRC results

ERC results

References

External links

Living people
Scottish rally drivers
People from Duns, Scottish Borders
1986 births

M-Sport drivers
Intercontinental Rally Challenge drivers